Neuern is an unincorporated community in the towns of Luxemburg and Montpelier, Kewaunee County, Wisconsin, United States.

References

Unincorporated communities in Kewaunee County, Wisconsin
Unincorporated communities in Wisconsin